Johan Christiaan Dirk "Joop" van Werkhoven (born 20 May 1950 in Haarlem) is a sailor from the Netherlands, who represented his native country at the 1976 Summer Olympics in Kingston, Ontario, Canada. With his brother Robert van Werkhoven as crew Van Werkhoven took the 13th place in the 470.

Professional life
 Director KLM USA Passage
 Member of the board Volmac NV/Capgemini Benelux
 Managing Director Calmax bv
 CEO Brink's Nederland bv
 Member executive committee Brink's EMEA

Sources
 
 
 
 
 
 
 
 

Living people
1950 births
Sportspeople from Haarlem
Dutch male sailors (sport)
Sailors at the 1976 Summer Olympics – 470
Olympic sailors of the Netherlands
20th-century Dutch people
21st-century Dutch people